Danbury High School is a public high school located in the city of Danbury, Texas (USA). The school is classified as a 3A school by the UIL. It is part of the Danbury Independent School District located in east central Brazoria County. In 2015, the school was rated "Met Standard" by the Texas Education Agency.

Athletics 
The Danbury Panthers compete in these sports - 

Baseball
Basketball
Cross Country
Football
Golf
Powerlifting
Softball
Tennis
Track and Field
Volleyball

The school has a junior varsity and varsity cheerleading team and a marching band. The track around the football field was recently repaired/resurfaced, and a new weight room has been added as well.

State Titles
Baseball 
2009(2A)
Softball 
2004(2A), 2011(2A)
One Act Play 
1967(B)

State Finalist
Boys Basketball 
2001(2A)

State Semi-finalists: Softball - 2012(2A)

References

External links 
Danbury Independent School District

High schools in Brazoria County, Texas
Public high schools in Texas